Masic, or Mašić, is a surname which may refer to:

 Admir Masic, American engineer
 Ante Mašić (born 1985), Bosnian basketball player
 Mia Mašić (born 1993), Croatian female basketball player
 Pavao Mašić (born 1980), Croatian harpsichordist and organist
 Sead Mašić (born 1959), Bosnian footballer